Kamichetty Venougopala Rao Naidu better known as The Grand Old Man of Yanaon was Mayor and MLA of Yanaon during French rule in first half of 20th century. He was one of the two powerful political leaders in Yanam during French rule. His opponent was Bezawada Bapa Naidou, the first mayor of Yanam. After death of Bapa Naidou, he became Mayor of Yanam (Maire de Yanaon) and even his family became very dominant in Yanam politics for at least 50 years thence.

Legacy of Kamichetty family
He was hornoured with Grade de chevalier in 1931. His son's wife Kamichetty Savithiry became Conseiller Municipal from Kankalapet and later became MLA of Yanam. It was told that after MLA elections, she and Yerra Jaganatha Rao got same votes, so they kept lottery and she won it.  His son Kamichetty Sri Parassourama Varaprassada Rao Naidu became MLA of Yanam and made it his pocket borough for nearly 40 years.

It was Venugopalarao Naidou who provoked his son who was a pro-French leader to support merger of Yanam. There was a street named Kamichetty in Yanam.

Offices held

References
 Annuaire statistique des établissements français dans l'Inde by Pierre-Constant Sicé.
 La Gazette de I'Etat de Pondichéry (Gazette of Pondicherry).

See also
Yanam, French India
Yanam Municipality
Dadala Rafael Ramanayya
Colonial History of Yanam
Bouloussou Soubramaniam Sastroulou
Kamichetty Sri Parassourama Varaprassada Rao Naidu

Naidou, Kamichetty Venugopala Rao
Naidou, Kamichetty Venugopala Rao
Naidou, Kamichetty Venugopala Rao
Year of birth missing
Year of death missing
Mayors of Yanam
fr:Samatam Krouschnaya